Carex blepharicarpa is a species of sedge with a native range consisting of Sakhalin in the Russian Far East, Korea and Japan.

References 

blepharicarpa
Flora of Japan
Flora of Korea
Flora of the Kuril Islands
Flora of Sakhalin